Nastanirh (also Nashtanir; Bengali: নষ্টনীড়, Nôshţoniŗh; English: 'The Broken Nest') is a 1901 Bengali novella by Rabindranath Tagore. It is the basis for the noted 1964 film Charulata, by Satyajit Ray.

Background
According to Mary Lago in the introduction to the English translation of Nashtanir (translated by Lago and Supriya Sen), the novella was released three times: in 1901 in serial format, in 1909 as part of a special short story collection, and in 1926 as part of Tagore's standard collection of fiction (p. 9).

Scholarship indicates that this story might have been based upon the relationship between Tagore's elder brother Jyotirindranath; his brother's wife, Kadambari Devi (who committed suicide shortly after Tagore's marriage); and Tagore (who spent a great deal of time with Kadambari, reading and writing poetry).

Plot summary
Nastanirh takes place in late 19th-century Bengal and explores the lives of the "Bhadralok", Bengalis of wealth who were part of the Bengal Renaissance and highly influenced by the Brahmo Samaj. Despite his liberal ideas, Bhupati is blind to the loneliness and dissatisfaction of his wife, Charu. It is only with the appearance of his cousin, Amal, who incites passionate feelings in Charu, that Bhupati realizes what he has lost.

Film adaptations
Charulata is a 1964 film by Bengali director Satyajit Ray, featuring Soumitra Chatterjee, Madhabi Mukherjee, and Sailen Mukherjee, and is based upon Nastanirh. Another adaptation is Charuulata 2011 by director Agnidev Chatterjee.

English translation
Tagore, Rabindranath. Broken Nest (Nashtanir). Mary M. Lago and Supriya Sen (translators). New Delhi: Macmillan India Ltd, 2000.

See also

Ghare Baire
Works of Rabindranath Tagore
Parineeta - contemporary novel

References

External links
 Seely, Clinton B. "Translating Between Media: Rabindranath Tagore and Satyajit Ray"
 Sen, Kaustav "Our Culture, Their Culture:Indian-ness in Satyajit Ray and Rabindranath Tagore explored through their works Charulata and Nashtanir"

 rabindra-rachanabali.nltr.org

Indian novellas
1901 novels
Novels by Rabindranath Tagore
Novels set in Bengal
Indian novels adapted into films
Indian Bengali-language novels